The Mayor of Khulna City is the chief executive of the Khulna City Corporation in Bangladesh. The Mayor's office administers all city services, public property, most public agencies, and enforces all city and state laws within Khulna city.

The Mayor's office is located in Nagar Bhaban; it has jurisdiction over all 31 wards of Khulna City.

List of officeholders 
Political parties

Other factions

Status

References 

 
Khulna